Graphium procles is a species of butterfly of the family Papilionidae. It is endemic to the Crocker Range in the Malaysian part of Borneo, including Mount Kinabalu. It occurs in lower montane forests above .

References

procles
Butterflies of Malaysia
Butterflies of Borneo
Endemic fauna of Malaysia
Endemic fauna of Borneo
Butterflies described in 1887
Taxa named by Henley Grose-Smith
Taxonomy articles created by Polbot